Group A of the 2018 FIBA Women's Basketball World Cup took place from 22 to 25 September, 2018. The group consisted of Canada, France, Greece, and South Korea.

The top team advanced to the quarterfinals, while the second and third placed team played in a qualification round.

Teams

Standings

Matches

South Korea vs France

Greece vs Canada

Canada vs South Korea

France vs Greece

South Korea vs Greece

Canada vs France

References

2018 FIBA Women's Basketball World Cup